Korotoumou Dembélé (born 18 February 1986) is a Malian former footballer. She has been a member of the Mali women's national team.

Club career
Dembélé has played for RC Saint-Étienne in France.

International career
Dembélé capped for Mali at senior level during the 2002 African Women's Championship.

References 

1986 births
Living people
Malian women's footballers
AS Saint-Étienne (women) players
Mali women's international footballers
Malian expatriate footballers
Malian expatriate sportspeople in France
Expatriate women's footballers in France
21st-century Malian people
Women's association footballers not categorized by position